MAIS may refer to:
Mallya Aditi International School
Maximum Abbreviated Injury Scale, a code used by  medical professionals to describe the most severe injury that a trauma patient has sustained under the Abbreviated Injury Scale
Mild androgen insensitivity syndrome
Mississippi Association of Independent Schools

See also
Mais (disambiguation)